The 2010 Minnesota Golden Gophers football team represented the University of Minnesota in the 2010 college football season. The Golden Gophers are members of the Big Ten Conference and played their home games at TCF Bank Stadium. They were led by fourth-year head coach Tim Brewster until his firing on October 17, 2010, the result of 1–6 start. Co-offensive coordinator Jeff Horton was tapped as interim head coach for the remainder of the season. The Golden Gophers finished the season 3–9, 2–6 in Big Ten play.

Schedule

References

Minnesota
Minnesota Golden Gophers football seasons
Minnesota Golden Gophers football